Hans Nichols (born 1977/1978) is an American journalist. Nichols is a political reporter for Axios. He is a former correspondent for NBC News and appears regularly live from the White House on MSNBC. Nichols has served as a subject matter expert about American politics on Washington Week, the Golf Channel, and KCRW, and Sierra Leone on National Public Radio.

On May 27, 2020, it was announced that Nichols would be leaving NBC and MSNBC to become a political reporter at Axios. He is expected to cover the Joe Biden campaign and other national political issues.  A timetable for the move was not specified.

Early life and education

Nichols is the son of Carola and Dr. Sam J. Nichols. His father was a radiologist. He earned a bachelor's degree magna cum laude from Cornell University, followed by his master's degree in political theory from the London School of Economics and degree in law from George Washington University. Nichols was named a Fulbright Scholar in 2005.

Career

Nichols was a writer for the Los Angeles Times in 2006.
As of 2009, Nichols served as White House correspondent for Bloomberg News. By 2016, he was serving as an international correspondent for Bloomberg News. In June 2016, Nichols became Pentagon correspondent for NBC News, replacing Jim Miklaszewski. Currently, he serves as a news correspondent for NBC News and regularly appears on air on MSNBC.

Personal life

Nichols married reporter Jessica Holzer in Bend, Oregon in 2009. The couple lives in the Washington, D.C. area and have three children.

References

External links

21st-century American journalists
Journalists from Washington, D.C.
NBC News people
Cornell University alumni
Alumni of the London School of Economics
George Washington University Law School alumni
Year of birth missing (living people)
Living people
1970s births